Ostreopsidaceae is a family of free-living dinoflagellates found in marine environments.

Genera
The World Register of Marine Species includes the following genera in the family :
Alexandrium Halim
Centrodinium Kofoid
Coolia Meunier
Fukuyoa Gomez, Qiu, Lopes & Lin
Gambierdiscus Adachi & Fukuyo
Ostreopsis J.Schmidt

References

Gonyaulacales
Dinoflagellate families